The Piano Trio No. 5 in C major, K. 548, was written by Wolfgang Amadeus Mozart in July 1788. It is scored for piano, violin and cello.

Movements 
The work is in three movement form:

References

External links

Piano trios by Wolfgang Amadeus Mozart
Compositions in C major
1788 compositions